Aethes fernaldana is a species of moth of the family Tortricidae. It was described by Walsingham in 1879. It is found in the United States, where it has been recorded from California, Oregon, Indiana and Ohio. Sightings have been made in parts of Canada as well.

References

fernaldana
Moths described in 1879
Moths of North America